Greg Holland is an American country musician. Holland grew up in Douglas, Georgia, where he performed as a youngster in local play productions and on television. He recorded a demo before reaching his teens and opened in concert for Ronnie Milsap when he was 12 years old. Holland played several instruments in the school band in high school, and also played in a rock group called The Bad Boys. He spent three years in the Army, performing with a soldiers' group in Europe, and upon his return signed with Warner Bros. Records. Two solo albums followed, one for Warner in 1994 and one for Asylum in 1997.

Discography

Albums

Singles

Music videos

References

American country singer-songwriters
American male singer-songwriters
Living people
1967 births
Asylum Records artists
People from Douglas, Georgia
Country musicians from Georgia (U.S. state)
Singer-songwriters from Georgia (U.S. state)